Edward Mann may refer to:

Edward Mann (Australian politician) (1874–1951), Nationalist member of the Australian House of Representatives and radio commentator
Edward C. Mann (1880–1931), former United States Representative from South Carolina
Edward S. Mann (1905–2005), educator and former president of the Eastern Nazarene College in Massachusetts
Edward W. Mann, state legislator in Colorado
Edward Mann (designer), London-based hat designer active 1950s-1980s
Edward Mann (boxer), ABA Middleweight Champion
Edward Mann (horseman) in Canadian Horse Racing Hall of Fame
Edward Mann (editor) of I Met My Love Again

See also
Ed Mann (born 1954), musician
Edward Mann - stage name for Spanish movie director Santos Alcocer